Fan Chengcheng (born 16 June 2000) is a Chinese singer, rapper and actor. He is a former member of the Chinese boy group Nine Percent and a member of Yuehua's NEXT.

Early life 
Fan was born on 16 June 2000 in Qingdao, Shandong.

Career 

Fan Chengcheng participated in the Chinese boy band survival program Idol Producer aired from 19 January to 6 April 2018. He eventually placed 3rd in the final episode and debuted as a member of Nine Percent.

While promoting with Nine Percent, before disbandment, Fan debuted as a member of Yuehua's new boy band NEX7 with the song "Wait a Minute" on 21 June 2018. On 23 June 2018, NEX7 held their first fan meeting in Beijing, China. Fan released his first digital single, titled "I'm Here" on 22 November 2018, and "Dumb Show" in December. On December 18, he was awarded the New Power Artist of the Year in the 10th Beijing News "China Fashion Power List". On May 4, 2019, he served as a resident guest of Zhejiang Television's "Youth Periplous Season". He released his debut EP on 16 June, with "Like A Fan" serving as the title track. Fan was also cast in several variety shows such as Chase Me in 2019. On July 31, 2020, he joined the second season of "The Man Doing Housework"; on October 22, he joined the guest lineup of "Trend partner 2". On March 3, 2021, French luxury brand Givenchy announced that singer and actor Fan Chengcheng became its brand spokesperson. On October 15, 2021, participate in the "Beautiful and Wonderful Night of Douyin". He was also cast in his first television series, Spirit Realm alongside Cheng Xiao.

From 2018 to 2020, he participated in Zhejiang Television's New Year's Eve Concert for three consecutive years. On October 17, 2019, Fan Chengcheng was included in the 2019 Forbes China 30 Under 30 Elite List.

Personal life 
Fan is the younger brother of Chinese actress Fan Bingbing.

Discography

Extended plays

Singles

Filmography

Television series

Film

Television shows

Magazine

Notes

References 

2000 births
Living people
Idol Producer contestants
Nine Percent members
Musicians from Qingdao
Singers from Shandong
21st-century Chinese male singers
21st-century Chinese male actors
Chinese male television actors
Chinese male dancers
Chinese male rappers